St. Mary's University School of Law is one of the professional graduate schools of St. Mary's University, a private Catholic university located in San Antonio, Texas, USA.

Academics 
The School of Law has an enrollment of about 770 students, pursuing Juris Doctor (J.D.), Master of Laws (LL.M.), or Master of Jurisprudence (M.Jur.) degrees.

Ranking, bar passage, and employment outcomes 
The 2020 Rankings by U.S. News & World Report place the school at No. 147-193 of U.S. law schools, in the bottom quartile. According to St. Mary's ABA-required disclosures, 60% of St. Mary's 2017 graduates found full-time long-term employment that required bar passage.

History 
In October 1927, the San Antonio Bar Association established the San Antonio School of Law, which for seven years after its founding was administered by a board of governors under the control of the bar association. Until the School of Law became associated with a physical campus, classes were held at the Bexar County Courthouse. In an attempt to maximize the educational and material resources of the fledgling institution, the Board of Governors negotiated with St. Mary's University regarding a transfer of the School of Law's administrative control. The transfer was completed on October 1, 1934, and St. Mary's University School of Law was officially established.

The School of Law was then housed at St. Mary's University's original downtown campus at 112 College Street. Possessing several military bases, San Antonio experienced a surge of population and industry in the years immediately following the World War II. This exponential growth resulted in more law students. To meet these new demands adequately, the School of Law organized itself to meet the requirements of the American Bar Association and the Association of American Law Schools. It received accreditation from the ABA in February 1948 and became a member of the AALS in December 1949.

On December 19, 1967, the School of Law relocated from the College Street campus to join the main campus of St. Mary's, where an expansion project had provided for the addition of eight new buildings to the main University campus, including a lecture hall, law library, and faculty building comprising the Law Center.

Admissions and costs 
According to St. Mary's 2017 ABA-required disclosures, 1,339 people applied to enter in the fall of 2017. 63% of those applicants were accepted, and 34% of those admitted enrolled at the school. For students enrolling in the fall of 2017, the average LSAT score was 150, and the average GPA was 3.12.

The total cost of full-time attendance (indicating the cost of tuition, fees, and living expenses) at St. Mary's for the 2016–17 academic year was $56,994, of which tuition is $36,310. The total cost for part-time attendance is $44,654, of which tuition is $23,970.

Centers 
The Center for Terrorism Law aims to address "current and potential legal issues related to terrorism in light of the challenge of achieving and maintaining a proper balance between global security and civil justice." It recently secured a $1 million U.S. Department of Defense appropriation to study "Homeland Defense and Civil Support Threat Information Collection." This grant was conditioned upon "independent information gathering [by the Center] to compile and study all of the various state legislation that has been enacted (particularly since 9/11) related to how various state governments have chosen to balance the issue of increased security concerns and the protection of civil liberties."  The Center is directed by Professor of Law Jeffrey Addicott .

The Center for International Legal Studies developed following the passage of the North American Free Trade Agreement (NAFTA) and the establishment of the North American Development Bank in San Antonio.  The program was created to develop relationships with foreign universities and conduct public service outreach in the Mexico-U.S. border area.  Through course offerings, overseas programs, faculty and student exchanges, and other activities, the Center offers extensive exposure to comparative and international law.

The Center for Legal and Social Justice permits students to act as the attorney of record for indigent clients who cannot find legal help elsewhere.  It offers three clinical programs to students: the Civil Justice Clinic; the Immigration and Human Rights Clinic; the Criminal Justice Clinic.  The center also houses the School of Law's pro bono program for which students may participate by volunteering in the community, including the Identification Recovery Program. Through the ID Recovery Program, students help those individuals without the means to obtain recovery of their identification credentials retrieve them—often at no cost to the individual.  In addition, the Center for Legal and Social Justice recently partnered with the University of Texas School of Law Richard and Ginni Mithoff Pro Bono Program to launch the San Antonio Gender Affirmation Project. The inaugural clinic was held on April 20, 2019, at The Center — San Antonio Pride Center. Students from both of the law schools organized the clinic, with community stakeholders. The clinic was the culmination of the work of the volunteer attorneys, student attorney supervisors, local media, student volunteers, and the director of The Center, among others.

Facilities 
The Sarita Kenedy East Law Library is the largest legal information center in San Antonio and the surrounding area. A federal depository, the Library's collection consists of print, microfilm, and multimedia items totaling over 400,000 volumes (or equivalent). The facility includes two large reading rooms and shelving spaces, two computer labs, a Rare Book Room, an Alumni Room (for reading and receptions), 17 conference rooms (or group studies), 136 study carrels, three media/instruction classrooms, and three copy/printing centers. There is a popular reading area in the library with popular magazines and newspapers. There is also a student lounge for breaks and snacks. The library also houses the law review offices of the St. Mary's Law Journal and The Scholar. In addition, the library is home to the Office of Career Services.

In 2006, the Courtroom at St. Mary's underwent a $1 million renovation.  The modernization project included the installation of information technology tools, which mirror that of the courtrooms in the Bexar County Courthouse. The Courtroom seats 300 and features interchangeable furniture and fixture configurations, suiting the needs of either appellate or trial proceedings. The full Texas Supreme Court, an en banc panel of Texas Courts of Appeals, and a panel of judges of the United States Court of Appeals for the Fifth Circuit has presided over mock proceedings in the Moot Courtroom.

Publications 

The School of Law is home to three legal periodicals: the St. Mary's Law Journal, St. Mary's Journal on Legal Malpractice & Ethics, and The Scholar: St. Mary's Law Review on Race and Social Justice.

The Scholar: St. Mary's Law Review on Race and Social Justice focuses exclusively on legal issues that impact minorities across the world.  The Scholar's inaugural issue was published in 1999.
 The St. Mary's Journal on Legal Malpractice & Ethics addresses legal malpractice and ethics issues that impact the daily work of legal practitioners.  
 The St. Mary's Law Journal is produced by the students of St. Mary's University School of Law.

Advocacy programs 

St. Mary's is home to several external advocacy teams: Mock trial, Moot court, Arbitration, and Negotiation.  Since the year 2000, the Moot Court program has brought St. Mary's two state championships, numerous regional championships, two national finalist rankings, and two national championships in advocacy. St. Mary's students have been individually recognized as well, receiving numerous brief and advocacy awards, including Best Brief at a National competition (twice), Best Brief in the State of Texas, and Best Advocate in the state (twice), region (twice), and nation (twice).

The St. Mary's Moot Court team was the 2010 national champion of the Civil Rights and Liberties Moot Court Competition (CRAL),.  Marian Reilly, a St. Mary's student, was recognized for the second year in a row as the Best Brief Writer.  Trevor Hall, another St. Mary's student, was awarded the Best Advocate Award for the final round.

The Black Law Student Association's Mock Trial Team won the Rocky Mountain Region Thurgood Marshall Mock Trial in 2008–2009 and were regional finalists in the 2010 competition.

The School of Law has hosted a variety of advocacy competitions.  Recently, the School of Law hosted the 2010 Lone Star Classic, an annual invitational mock trial tournament open to ABA-accredited law schools nationwide.  Additionally, the School of Law recently hosted the National Finals of the Arbitration Competition, conducted by the ABA Law Student Division and the National Arbitration Forum.

Internship and study abroad programs 

The School of Law hosts the St. Mary's University Institute on World Legal Problems in Innsbruck, in the Tyrol region of Austria, which students have the opportunity to attend each summer. Currently, under the direction of Professor Michael Ariens and Professor Mark Cochran, several prominent legal scholars have taught courses or lectured at the institute, including Chief Justice of the United States William Rehnquist, who returned for several summers, and Frank Höpfel, ad litem judge on the International Criminal Tribunal for the former Yugoslavia. The 2009 Distinguished Visiting Jurist was Supreme Court Associate Justice Samuel Alito.

The St. Mary's University School of Law Institute on Chinese Law and Business prepares law students for representing clients doing business with Chinese partners. Located each summer at Beihang University in Beijing, China, the Institute introduces students to the Chinese legal system and the instruments of international and domestic law governing cross-border sales of goods, protection of intellectual property, and investments. Participants learn about the practical realities of doing business in China, as well as the dispute resolution mechanisms that play a large role in enforcing private agreements between enterprises in China and the United States.  Most American students hold internships in leading law firms and corporate legal offices in Beijing during their participation in the program.

The School of Law offers many Judicial Internships to its students in conjunction with the following courts:

The Texas Court of Criminal Appeals; and
The Texas Fourth Court of Appeals.
The United States Bankruptcy Court for the Western District of Texas;
The United States Court of Appeals for the Fifth Circuit;
The United States District Court for the Western District of Texas;
The United States Magistrate Court for the Western District of Texas;

In addition, students from St. Mary's University often participate in three judicial internship programs in Austin operated under the supervision of the University of Texas School of Law. Those internships are with:

Texas Court of Criminal Appeals; and
The Texas Supreme Court;
The Texas Third Court of Appeals.

Deans 
Nine individuals have held the title of dean:

1927–1938, Anton N. Moursund
1938–1942, Henry B. Dielmann
1946–1978, Ernest A. Raba
1978–1989, James N. Castleberry Jr.
1989–1998, Barbara Bader Aldave
1998–2007, Robert William "Bill" Piatt
2007–2014, Charles E. Cantú
2014–2019, Stephen M. Sheppard
2019–2020, Vincent R. Johnson (interim)
2020–present, Patricia Roberts

Notable alumni

References

External links 

St. Mary's Law Journal Website
St. Mary's Sarita Kenedy East Law Library Website

Catholic law schools in the United States
Law schools in Texas
Law
Universities and colleges in San Antonio
1927 establishments in Texas